Gabriela Maria Windey (born January 2, 1991) is an American television personality who appeared on season 26 of The Bachelor, and co-starred in season 19 of The Bachelorette alongside Rachel Recchia.

Early life and education 
Windey was born in O'Fallon, Illinois, to parents Rosemary Hewitt and Patrick Windey. She has an older sister named Jazz. Windey is half Mexican with some Apache ancestry. She attended O'Fallon Township High School, where she was the sports editor in the school paper and won Miss O'Fallon in 2008. She graduated from the University of Colorado Colorado Springs in 2013, and then moved to Denver, Colorado.

Career 
Windey worked as an ICU nurse at University of Colorado Hospital. She was also a cheerleader for the Denver Broncos for 5 years.

In 2021, she was the co-winner of the Pop Warner Humanitarian Award for her service on the frontline of the pandemic. She is the first woman and NFL cheerleader to receive the award.

Reality television

The Bachelor 
In September 2021, Windey was revealed to be a contestant on season 26 of The Bachelor, starring medical sales representative Clayton Echard. She was the co runner-up with fellow finalist Rachel Recchia.

The Bachelorette 

During the live After the Final Rose special of Echard's season, Windey was announced as The Bachelorette alongside Rachel. This marks the first time that there will be two leads for an entire season.

Dancing with the Stars 
On September 8, 2022, Windey was announced as a contestant on season 31 of Dancing with the Stars. She was partnered with Val Chmerkovskiy and they finished in 2nd place. During the finale, she was announced as one of the co-hosts for the Dancing with the Stars Live 2023 tour and will be at all stops.

Personal life 

Windey was in a relationship with The Bachelorette and Bachelor in Paradise contestant Dean Unglert when they were in college. 

During her time on The Bachelor, Windey revealed she is not close with her mother and has not spoken to her in years.

On May 13, 2022, Windey got engaged to Erich Schwer, whom she chose as the winner on her season of The Bachelorette. They announced their breakup on November 4, 2022.

Filmography

References

External links

Living people
1991 births
American television personalities of Mexican descent
American women television personalities
Bachelor Nation contestants
University of Colorado Colorado Springs alumni
American people of Apache descent
American people who self-identify as being of Native American descent
People from St. Clair County, Illinois